Choi Chul-soon (born February 8, 1987) is a South Korean footballer who plays as a right back. He is currently playing for Jeonbuk Hyundai Motors. He has previously played for the Korean national U-23 football team which is also known as the Olympic National Team.

He was a member of the Korean national U-20 football team for 2007 FIFA U-20 World Cup in Canada as a central defender and was also a member of Korean National U-19 Football Team for 2006 AFC Youth Championship in India. However, he has been a fullback since Korean national U-23 football team.

On 9 January 2010, Choi made his first international cap for South Korea at the friendly match against Zambia.

Club career statistics 
As of 4 December 2020

1Includes FIFA Club World Cup and K League Promotion-Relegation Playoffs.

Honours

Club
 Jeonbuk Hyundai Motors
 AFC Champions League (2) : 2006, 2016
 K League 1 (8) : 2009, 2011, 2014, 2015, 2017, 2018, 2019, 2020
 KFA Cup : 2020

 Sangju Sangmu
 K League 2 : 2013

International

South Korea
 EAFF East Asian Cup : 2017

Individual
 K League 1 Best XI (2) : 2011, 2017
 K League 2 Best XI : 2013

References

External links
 
 FIFA Player Statistics

1987 births
Living people
Association football defenders
South Korean footballers
South Korea under-20 international footballers
South Korea under-23 international footballers
South Korea international footballers
Jeonbuk Hyundai Motors players
Gimcheon Sangmu FC players
K League 1 players
K League 2 players
Chungbuk National University alumni